HMS E49 was an E-class submarine built by Swan Hunter, Wallsend for the Royal Navy. She was laid down on 15 February 1915 and was commissioned on 14 December 1916. E49 was mined off the Shetland Islands on 12 March 1917. The minefield was laid by the German U-boat  on 10 March 1917. There were no survivors. E49 lies  down with her bows blown off.

Design
She was powered by two  Vickers eight-cylinder two-stroke diesel engines and two  electric motors.

E49 was armed with a 12-pounder  QF gun mounted forward of the conning tower. She had five 18 inch (450 mm) torpedo tubes, two in the bow, one either side amidships, and one in the stern; a total of 10 torpedoes were carried.

E-Class submarines had wireless systems with  power ratings; in some submarines, these were later upgraded to  systems by removing a midship torpedo tube. Their maximum design depth was  although in service some reached depths of below . Some submarines contained Fessenden oscillator systems.

Memorial 
A memorial to the 31 submariners lost in the sinking of E49 was unveiled in Baltasound, Unst, on 12 March 2017.  The memorial was organised by retired local police constable Harry Edwards.  The unveiling was attended by members of the crew of Royal Navy submarine HMS Vengeance (S31) and descendants of E49 First officer Basil Beal and second-in-command Reay Parkinson.

References

Bibliography

External links
 'Submarine losses 1904 to present day' - Royal Navy Submarine Museum

 

British E-class submarines of the Royal Navy
Ships built on the River Tyne
1916 ships
World War I submarines of the United Kingdom
World War I shipwrecks in the North Sea
Royal Navy ship names
Maritime incidents in 1917
Ships built by Swan Hunter
History of Shetland
Protected Wrecks of Scotland